Euphorbia seguieriana is a species of flowering plant belonging to the family Euphorbiaceae.

Its native range is Europe to China and Pakistan.

References

seguieriana
Taxa named by Noël Martin Joseph de Necker